Ronnie Wong Man-chiu, JP (born 3 April 1952) is a Hong Kong politician, businessman and former Olympic swimmer.

Biography

Wong was born into a wealthy shipping family. His father  founded Chung Wah Shipbuilding & Engineering Company. He graduated from the La Salle College and the Armstrong State University. He also obtained a MBA from the Florida Institute of Technology.

Wong was a member of the Hong Kong Basic Law Consultative Committee (BLCC). He joined the business and professional group of the BLCC but later split with it on the concept of the electoral methods of the future Chief Executive and the Legislative Council after 1997 and joined the pro-Beijing New Hong Kong Alliance which put forward an ultra-conservative proposal and later became chairman of the alliance.

In 1986, Wong was appointed to the Urban Council of Hong Kong and was re-appointed in 1991. In 1991, he ran with Winnie Cheung Wai-sun in the Island West constituency in the first Legislative Council direct election but was defeated by United Democrat candidates Yeung Sum and Huang Chen-ya. In 1995 Urban Council election, he won a seat in Ap Lei Chau by defeating Democratic Party's Andrew Cheng Kar-foo. In the 1998 Legislative Council election, he contested for the Urban Council constituency but was defeated by Ambrose Cheung Wing-sum. In 2000, he was appointed to the Southern District Council.

Wong was a swimming champion of Hong Kong. He represented Hong Kong in 2 Olympic Games and 3 Asian Games. He is the president of the Hong Kong Amateur Swimming Association. In the 2008 Beijing Olympic Games, he was one of the torchbearers in the Hong Kong Torch Relay.

He was also chairman of the Po Leung Kuk from 1985 to 1986.

See also
Peter Wong Man-kong, brother

References

External links
 Ronnie Wong's Olympic Stats

1952 births
Living people
Armstrong State University alumni
Florida Institute of Technology alumni
Hong Kong Basic Law Consultative Committee members
New Hong Kong Alliance politicians
District councillors of Southern District
Members of the Urban Council of Hong Kong
Hong Kong businesspeople
Olympic swimmers of Hong Kong
Swimmers at the 1968 Summer Olympics
Swimmers at the 1972 Summer Olympics
Swimmers at the 1966 Asian Games
Swimmers at the 1970 Asian Games
Commonwealth Games competitors for Hong Kong
Swimmers at the 1970 British Commonwealth Games
Members of the Election Committee of Hong Kong, 2000–2005
Members of the Election Committee of Hong Kong, 2007–2012
Members of the Election Committee of Hong Kong, 2012–2017
Members of the Election Committee of Hong Kong, 2017–2021
Members of the Election Committee of Hong Kong, 2021–2026
Asian Games competitors for Hong Kong
Sportsperson-politicians